The Replacement is a British television drama. It began airing on BBC One on 28 February 2017. The three-part serial was filmed and set in Glasgow.

Plot

Ellen, an architect, is expecting her first child. Her firm decide to bring in maternity cover. Ellen is impressed by Paula, who had taken a career break to look after her daughter, but now wants to return to work. Initially Ellen and Paula get on, but Ellen begins to fear Paula is taking over her professional and personal life.

Cast
 Morven Christie as Ellen Rooney, a successful architect who gets pregnant while working on a big project
 Vicky McClure as Paula Reece, an architect prodigy looking to return to work after raising her daughter
 Richard Rankin as Ian Rooney, Ellen's psychiatrist husband whom she met after becoming his patient
 Dougray Scott as David Warnock, manager of Ellen's firm. He is married to Kay yet harbours feelings for Ellen
 Neve McIntosh as Kay Gillies, an award-winning career-minded architect and friend to Ellen
 Navin Chowdhry as Kieran, Paula's husband and confidant

Episodes

References

External links 
 
 
 

2017 British television series debuts
2017 British television series endings
2010s British drama television series
BBC television dramas
2010s British television miniseries
English-language television shows
Television series by Left Bank Pictures
Television shows set in Glasgow